Lebanon competed at the 1960 Winter Olympics in Squaw Valley, United States.

Alpine skiing

Men

References
Official Olympic Reports
 Olympic Winter Games 1960, full results by sports-reference.com

Nations at the 1960 Winter Olympics
1960
1960 in Lebanese sport